Sahara is a Bollywood film. It was released in 1943. The film is directed by Jagatrai Pesumal Advani for Vaswani Art productions. It had music composed by Gobind Ram. The film starred Renuka Devi, Narang, Pran, Meena Kumari and Sharda

References

External links
 

1943 films
1940s Hindi-language films
Indian black-and-white films